Omilos Filathlon Agios Matthaios Football Club is a Greek football club based in Ágios Matthaíos, Corfu, Greece.

Honors

Domestic

 Corfu FCA Champions: 6
 1994–95, 1999–00, 2001–02, 2005–06, 2012–13, 2019-20
 Corfu FCA Cup Winners: 5
 1996–97, 1997–98, 2001–02, 2014–15, 2017-18
 Corfu FCA Super Cup Winners: 2
 2006, 2013

References

Corfu
Association football clubs established in 1972
1972 establishments in Greece
Gamma Ethniki clubs